Omus audouini, or Audouin's night-stalking tiger beetle, is a species of tiger beetle in the family Carabidae. It is found in North America. In the United States, it is found along the west coast, while in Canada it is very limited to Boundary Bay and a small patch along the coast of Victoria island.

Subspecies
These two subspecies belong to the species Omus audouini:
 Omus audouini aequicornis Casey
 Omus audouini audouini

References

Further reading

 

Cicindelidae
Articles created by Qbugbot
Beetles described in 1838
Beetles of North America